The Early Chapters of Revelation is a 3 CDs box-set released by Swedish heavy metal band Therion in 2000. Box-set contains remastered and rereleased first three albums of the official Therion's discography during their death metal era: Of Darkness..., Beyond Sanctorum and Symphony Masses: Ho Drakon Ho Megas. Title refers to Book of Revelation.

Track listing

Disc one: Of Darkness...
See: Of Darkness... re-release track listing

Disc two: Beyond Sanctorum
See: Beyond Sanctorum re-release track listing

Disc three: Symphony Masses: Ho Drakon Ho Megas
Track listing is unchanged. See: Symphony Masses: Ho Drakon Ho Megas track listing

Cover arts
Cover arts of box-set releases are different from the original.

2000 compilation albums
Therion (band) compilation albums
Nuclear Blast compilation albums